Gardenia  is a  1979 Italian poliziottesco film directed by Domenico Paolella. It represents the first leading role for the singer-songwriter Franco Califano.

Plot 
In the city of Rome lives Gardenia, a respected exponent of Roman organized crime who shows a certain humanity in managing his business. He runs a restaurant and a clandestine gambling house, and has a woman named Regina.

Contacted by Don Salluzzo, a mafia boss, he categorically refuses to enter the drug business and sell it in his restaurant.

Because of his refusal he comes into conflict with Salluzzo who tries several times to eliminate him, but with the help of some childhood friends he finally manages to win.

Cast
Franco Califano as Gardenia
Martin Balsam as Salluzzo 
Robert Webber as Tony Caruso 
Eleonora Vallone as Regina
Licinia Lentini as Miriam Bella
Franco Diogene as Friend of Gardenia
María Baxa as Gardenia Girl
Venantino Venantini as Nocita 
Lory Del Santo as Laura
Lorraine De Selle as Consuelo
Melissa Chimenti as Melissa

Release
Gardenia was released theatrically in Italy on 5 May 1979 where it was distributed by P.A.C. It grossed 108 million Italian lire on its release in Italy.

See also 
 List of Italian films of 1979

References

Footnotes

Sources

External links
 

1979 films
Poliziotteschi films
1979 crime films
Films directed by Domenico Paolella
1970s Italian-language films
English-language Italian films
1970s Italian films